Extreme Series: Kaya Mo Ba 'To? (English: Extreme Series: Can You Do This?) is a Philippine reality television show that aired on TV5 since February 2, 2015, hosted by Derek Ramsay. It airs every Monday to Friday nights at 10:15PM (PST).

Since May 2, 2015, the reality program will air every Saturday, 9:00pm after 2½ Daddies and before Rising Stars Philippines, replacing Everybody Hapi and was replaced by KISPinoy: The K-Pop Philippination.

See also
 List of programs aired by TV5 (Philippine TV network)

References

External links
 

TV5 (Philippine TV network) original programming
Philippine reality television series
2015 Philippine television series debuts
2015 Philippine television series endings
Filipino-language television shows